The 1901 China expedition commemorative medal was a French military campaign medal established by the law of 15 April 1902 to recognize service in China in 1900 and 1901 during the Boxer Rebellion.

In May 1900, an uprising throughout Northern China threatened the interests of nations with established concessions in major cities and leased territories in the Empire of China. This hostility against these powers was mainly driven by a secret nationalist and xenophobic group called "the Society of Righteous and Harmonious Fists", hence the name "Boxers" given to its members.

It was decided by eight major powers (Germany, Austria, United States, France, Britain, Italy, Japan and Russia) to establish an international army of 150,000 men under the supreme command of German Field Marshal Count von Waldersee to rescue their besieged compatriots in Peking and put down the rebellion in the provinces.  Allied troops entered Peking on 14 August 1900 but a peace treaty with China was only signed on 7 September 1901.

Award statute
The 1901 China expedition commemorative medal was awarded by the President of the French Republic, based on the recommendation of the minister under which the potential recipient served, to all officers, sailors and soldiers having participated in the French expedition to China during the following time periods:
for the personnel under the War Department, to all those who served in China between 30 June 1900 and 8 August 1901;
for the personnel under the Navy Department,
concerning members of crews, to those who were in service in theater between 30 May 1900 and 31 December 1901 who received an indemnity for service in China;
concerning officers, military functionaries or agents that did not figure on crew rosters, to those who received an indemnity for service in China covered in the decree of 4 August 1900 or an indemnity for expenses granted prior to 1 September 1900, in accordance with the order of the admiral commander in chief of the Far East naval division.

It was also awarded, on the recommendation of the Minister for External Affairs, to the French civilians who took part in the defence of the legations in Peking.

The law of 15 April 1904 added as potential recipients of the 1901 China expedition commemorative medal, the officers, sailors and soldiers, destined to take part in the expedition, who disembarked in the Tonkin between 30 June 1900 and 8 August 1901 on the condition they did not already receive the Colonial Medal for the same time period.

Award description
The 1901 China expedition commemorative medal was a 30mm in diameter circular silver medal.  The obverse bore the relief image of the effigy of the "warrior republic" in the form of the left profile of a helmeted woman's bust, the helmet being adorned by a crown of oak and laurel leaves. On either side, the relief inscription along the circumference "RÉPUBLIQUE FRANÇAISE".  The reverse bore a pagoda surrounded with military and naval articles or war. The ribbon's suspension loop was adorned with two Chinese dragons.

The medal hung from a 36 mm wide silk moiré yellow ribbon with four 4 mm wide equidistant green vertical stripes.

Noteworthy recipients (partial list)
General Robert Nivelle
General Maurice Bailloud
Vice admiral Antoine Exelmans
General Albert d'Amade
Admiral Raoul Castex
General Émile Edmond Legrand-Girarde
General Charles Louis Joseph Belhague
General César Alix
General Baron Charles Pierre Corvisart

See also

 Commemorative medal of the 1860 China Expedition: French campaign medal for the Second Opium War
 Tonkin Expedition commemorative medal: French campaign medal for the Sino-French War

References

External links
 Museum of the Legion of Honour (in French)

Military awards and decorations of France
Boxer Rebellion campaign medals
Awards established in 1902
1902 establishments in France
French campaign medals
China–France military relations